Nina Rosenblum (born September 20, 1950) is an American documentary film and television producer and director and member of the Academy of Motion Picture Arts and Sciences and the Directors Guild of America. Italian Fotoleggendo magazine said Rosenblum “is known in the United States as one of the most important directors of the investigative documentary”.

Her works as director and producer include Liberators: Fighting on Two Fronts in World War II, PBS, (nominated in 1992 for Academy Award for Best Documentary Feature); The Untold West: The Black West, TBS, (1993 Best Screenwriting Emmy Award); America and Lewis Hine, PBS,  (broadcast nationwide in 1984 on PBS and winner of Special Jury Prize at the Sundance Film Festival); The Skin I'm In (broadcast in 2000 on Showtime/NY Times Television) and Ordinary Miracles: The Photo League's New York (released theatrically in New York and Los Angeles in 2013).

Life and career

After attending Music and Art High School, Rosenblum earned her Bachelor of Fine Arts degree from Cooper Union and her Master of Fine Arts degree from Queens College after attending both Philadelphia School of the Arts and Yale's Summer School for the Arts.  She also received a Mellon Foundation Grant to attend NYU's Graduate Film School.  She is the daughter of photographer Walter Rosenblum and photographic historian Naomi Rosenblum, winners of the International Center for Photography's Lifetime Infinity Award.

Rosenblum's "America and Lewis Hine", voice of Hine by Jason Robards, about the pioneer photographer Lewis Hine who documented child labor and the building of America from 1900 to 1940, which premiered at the 1984 Sundance Film Festival where it won Special Jury Prize and was broadcast nationally on PBS. Through the Wire, narrated by Susan Sarandon, produced in association with Amnesty International, about the High Security Unit in the Federal Correctional Institution in Lexington, KY and the international movement to shut it down, premiered at the 1992 Berlin Film Festival and won Best Documentary at the 1992 Munich Film Festival.

In 2000, Ms. Rosenblum produced and directed a Showtime/ NYT Television documentary, Sly and Jimi: The Skin I'm In, about the music of Jimi Hendrix and Sly and the Family Stone. In 2000 she also produced and directed Twin Lenses, about twin fashion photographer Frances McLaughlin-Gill and Kathryn Abbe. In 1992, Ms. Rosenblum was nominated for an Academy Award for her Denzel Washington and Louis Gossett Jr. narrated PBS documentary, Liberators: Fighting On Two Fronts In World War II. This film was followed by The Untold West: The Black West, narrated by Danny Glover, which interwove documentary with dramatic segments and won an Emmy Award in 1994 for Best Screenwriting, was nominated for Cable Ace and Vision Awards, and aired on TBS.  These documentary achievements added to the acclaimed 1984 Sundance Special Jury Prize-winning America & Lewis Hine, broadcast on PBS. Rosenblum's 1990 Susan Sarandon narrated feature documentary, Through The Wire, broadcast on PBS, documents a graphic investigation of small group isolation and America's female political prisoners. Her 1992 feature documentary Lock-Up: The Prisoners Of Rikers Island, produced for HBO's America Undercover series, further solidified Rosenblum and Daedalus Productions as major producers on the non-fiction scene.

In 1999 Rosenblum produced and directed Walter Rosenblum: In Search Of Pitt Street, a feature documentary chronicling the photographic career of her father, Walter Rosenblum, a highly decorated US Army Signal Corps cameraman who documented the D-Day landing on Omaha Beach and the liberation of the concentration camp at Dachau. Walter Rosenblum: In Search Of Pitt Street premiered at the D-Day Museum, New Orleans, and has been screened at film festivals and broadcast here and abroad, winning numerous awards.  In 2000, Ms. Rosenblum produced a short, Unintended Consequences, about the "Mothers of the NY Disappeared" who protest the Rockefeller Mandatory Minimum Drug Laws. She then produced and directed Code Yellow: Hospital At Ground Zero, which documents the response of the NYU Downtown Hospital to 9/11. In 2004 she completed a feature documentary, Zahira's Peace, in co-production with Sogecable, Spain, which was broadcast on the first anniversary of the March 11 bombing on Canal+ Spain. She produced and directed In The Name Of Democracy, filmed by Haskell Wexler, the story of Lt. Ehren Watada, the first officer to refuse deployment to Iraq and who won his case.  In 2013 she produced Ordinary Miracles: The Photo League's New York, the story of the NY Photo League, which has been screened at festivals and educational institutions internationally.

Her credits also include Slaveship: The Testimony Of The Henrietta Marie (1995) and A History Of Women Photographers (1997), narrated by Maureen Stapleton, shorts included in traveling exhibitions across the United States. Rosenblum was credited on Henry Louis Gates PBS series Episode 6 for providing the story of Terrence Stevens, featured in that episode. She also provided his story to NY! For their segment “New Yorker of the Week”.  Rosenblum is currently working on an in-development film with writer/producer Dan Allentuck about the life and career of the renowned actress Maureen Stapleton.

Rosenblum is President of Daedalus Productions, which she and Dan Allentuck founded in 1980 to produce documentary films about issues not covered in the conventional media.  In 1994, she received the Washington, D.C. Women of Vision Award celebrating women's creative and technical achievements in media.  In 2011, Casa del Cinema in Rome, Italy co-sponsored by Fotoleggendo and ISFCI and the Villa Pignatelli in Naples, Italy held festivals of seven films produced by Daedalus Productions in honor of Rosenblum's contribution to cinema.

References 

Baylis, Sheila Cosgrove. "Twin Lenses Captures Career Photographers Vision"
 , "[Sundance Institute]
 Blau, Eleanor.  "A Photographer of Immigrants Is Remembered",  The New York Times, New York, 27 September 1984.
 Clavin, Tom. "One Pair of Filmmakers, One Documentary About a Pair of Photographers" [The East Hampton Press], New York, 8 October 2008.
 Harvey, Dennis. "Review: Walter Rosenblum: In Search of Pitt Street" ‘’[Variety]’’, 21 October 1999. 
 Di Sante, Joseph.  “Oscar Award Winning Director Nina Rosenblum Documents her Legendary Father, Walter Rosenblum, Photographer” ‘’The Industry’’, Winter 2000.
 Tucker, Ken. “TV Review: P.O.V.: Through the Wire (1988)” ‘’Entertainment Weekly’’, 22 June 1990. 
 Goodma, Walter. “Review/Television; 3 Women in a High-Security Prison” ‘’The New York Times’’, 25 June 1990.
 Scott, Tony. “Review: ‘The American Experience Liberators: Fighting on Two Fronts in World War II’” ‘’Variety’’, 10 November 1992. 
 Pristin, Terry. “SHORT TAKES / MOVIES : Documentarians Defend 'Liberators'’’ ‘’Los Angeles Times, 19 February 1993. 
 Behringer, Maggie. “A Conscientious Objector for These Times” ‘’Litchfield County Times’’, 2 April 2009. 
 Wildasin, Kathleen. “Review: The Black West” ‘’The New York Times’’, 1991. 
  ‘’Emmys’’, 1994.

External links
 

1950 births
Living people
American documentary film directors
Cooper Union alumni
Queens College, City University of New York alumni